Harold Richard Naragon (October 1, 1928 – August 31, 2019) was a catcher in Major League Baseball who played for the Cleveland Indians (1951; 1954–59) and Washington Senators/Minnesota Twins (1959–62). Naragon was born in Zanesville, Ohio and graduated from Barberton (Ohio) High School.

Career

In his 10-season MLB career, Naragon was a .266 hitter, with 262 hits, 27 doubles, 11 triples,  six home runs and 87 RBI in 424 games played. He recorded a .991 fielding percentage. His most productive season came in 1959, when he posted career-highs in games (85) and hits (57) while dividing his playing time with Cleveland and Washington. He also caught one inning for the Indians in Game 3 of the 1954 World Series against the New York Giants.  He spent much of his career backing up starting catchers Jim Hegan and Earl Battey.

Following his playing career, Naragon was the bullpen coach for the Minnesota Twins and Detroit Tigers from 1963–69. He was closely associated with pitching coach Johnny Sain, and was a member of the 1965 American League champion Twins and the 1968 world champion Tigers.

He participated in the 50th anniversary commemoration of the 1968 Detroit Tigers World Series championship in 2018 at Comerica Park.

Death
Naragon died August 31, 2019 at the age of 90.

References

External links

Hal Naragon - Baseballbiography.com
Bio from Cool of the Evening: The 1965 Minnesota Twins

1928 births
2019 deaths
Baseball players from Ohio
Cleveland Indians players
Detroit Tigers coaches
Harrisburg Senators players
Major League Baseball bullpen coaches
Major League Baseball catchers
Minnesota Twins coaches
Minnesota Twins players
Oklahoma City Indians players
Sportspeople from Zanesville, Ohio
Pittsfield Electrics players
San Diego Padres (minor league) players
Washington Senators (1901–1960) players
Watertown Athletics players